Aly Desse Sissoko (born 5 May 1995) is a Malian footballer who plays as a midfielder for Stade Malien and the Mali national team.

International career
Diarra made his professional debut with the Mali national team in a 0–0 2020 African Nations Championship qualification tie with Mauritania on 21 September 2019.

References

External links
 
 

1995 births
Living people
Sportspeople from Bamako
Malian footballers
Mali international footballers
Association football midfielders
Malian Première Division players
21st-century Malian people
Mali A' international footballers
2020 African Nations Championship players
Stade Malien players
CO de Bamako players
2022 African Nations Championship players